The Ciboney, or Siboney, were a Taíno people of western Cuba, Jamaica, and the Tiburon Peninsula of Haiti. A Western Taíno group living in central Cuba during the 15th and 16th centuries, they had a dialect and culture distinct from the Classic Taíno in the eastern part of the island, though much of the Ciboney territory was under the control of the eastern chiefs. Confusion in the historical sources led 20th-century scholars to apply the name "Ciboney" to the non-Taíno Guanahatabey of western Cuba and various archaic cultures around the Caribbean, but this is deprecated.

History
At the time of Spanish colonization, the Ciboney were the most populous group in Cuba. They inhabited the central part of the island, between western Pinar del Río Province and eastern Oriente Province. Bartolomé de las Casas, who lived among the Ciboney in the early 16th century, related that their dialect and culture was similar to that of the Lucayans of the present-day Bahamas. As such, scholars classify the Ciboney as a Western Taíno group, associating them with the peoples of the Bahamas, Jamaica, and westernmost Hispaniola, while distinguishing them from the Classic Taíno of eastern Cuba, most of Hispaniola, and Puerto Rico. In addition to the Classic Taíno in eastern Cuba, the Ciboney shared the island with the Guanahatabey, an archaic people inhabiting western Pinar del Río Province. The Ciboney spoke a dialect of the Taíno language conventionally known as Ciboney Taíno; it was distinct from, but mutually intelligible with, Classic Taíno.

The Ciboney were the dominant population in Cuba until around 1450. Las Casas states that unlike the highly organized Classic Taíno to the east, the Ciboney had no integrated chiefdoms or wider political structure. In the mid-15th century, Classic Taíno from Hispaniola began migrating into eastern Cuba, overcoming the native Ciboney. These "Cuban Taíno" established chiefdoms concentrated in Oriente Province, though they established settlements as far west as Havana Province. However, the Cuban Taíno never established an island-wide political structure as existed in Hispaniola and Puerto Rico. Classic Taíno migration from Hispaniola to Cuba increased after Spanish contact, with many Taíno leaving to escape the Spanish incursion. Notably, Hispaniola Taíno chief Hatuey fled to Cuba with most of his people; he remained there until the Spanish captured and executed him. Following the Spanish conquest of Cuba in 1511 under Diego Velázquez de Cuéllar, the population of all native groups declined precipitously until they had disappeared as distinct groups by the end of the century.

Confusion with the Guanahatabey
In the 20th century, misreadings of the historical record led scholars to confuse the Ciboney with both a neighbouring group, the Guanahatabey, and with archaic-level populations around the Caribbean. Las Casas referred to both the Ciboney and the Guanahatabey, but he was clear they were different: the Guanahatabey were a primitive society of hunter-gatherers in western Cuba, and they spoke a separate language distinct from Taíno. A confusion of the sources led archaeologists to use the term "Ciboney" for the aceramic (lacking pottery) archaeological sites found on various Caribbean islands. As many of these were found in the former Guanahatabey territory, the term became associated with the historical non-Taíno Guanahatabey. Scholars recognized the error in the 1980s and have restored the name "Ciboney" to the Western Taíno people of Cuba.

See also
Pre-Arawakan languages of the Greater Antilles
Siboney, Cuba, a town in eastern Cuba

Notes

References

 
Taíno
Circum-Caribbean tribes
Indigenous peoples in Cuba
Indigenous peoples of the Caribbean
Ethnic groups in Cuba
Ethnic groups in Jamaica
Paleo-Indian period
Ethnic groups in Antigua and Barbuda
History of Barbuda
History of Hispaniola